The Edward Morrison House, at 624 Main St. in Pukwana, South Dakota, was built in 1928.  It was listed on the National Register of Historic Places in 2005.

It was deemed to be a " a good example of the side gabled roof subtype of the Bungalow/Craftsman style of architecture in South Dakota."

It was built by Edward Morrison.

A second contributing building on the property is a garage with an attached cob house shed.

References

National Register of Historic Places in Brule County, South Dakota
Houses completed in 1928